How About That?, originally titled Weather and Why, is a Canadian children's science television series which aired on CBC Television from 1953 to 1954.

Premise
This series, hosted by the network's weather presenter Percy Saltzman, featured demonstrations of physics concepts and provided instructions on creating instruments such as rain gauges or anemometers out of common items.

Scheduling
This 15-minute series was broadcast on Tuesdays at 5:15 p.m. (Eastern) from 20 October 1953 until 29 June 1954. The first two weekly episodes were aired under the original title Weather and Why until it was retitled as of 4 November.

References

External links
 

CBC Television original programming
1953 Canadian television series debuts
1954 Canadian television series endings
Black-and-white Canadian television shows